The canton of Redessan is an administrative division of the Gard department, southern France. It was created at the French canton reorganisation which came into effect in March 2015. Its seat is in Redessan.

It consists of the following communes:
 
Argilliers
Bezouce
Cabrières
Castillon-du-Gard
Collias
Domazan
Estézargues
Fournès
Lédenon
Meynes
Montfrin
Pouzilhac
Redessan
Remoulins
Saint-Bonnet-du-Gard
Saint-Gervasy
Saint-Hilaire-d'Ozilhan
Sernhac
Théziers
Valliguières
Vers-Pont-du-Gard

References

Cantons of Gard